Sib (also Romanized as Sīb) is a village in Gheyzaniyeh Rural District, in the Central District of Ahvaz County, Khuzestan Province, Iran. At the 2006 census, its population was 46, in 5 families.

References 

Populated places in Ahvaz County